Manhunter 2: San Francisco is a post-apocalyptic adventure game designed by Barry Murry, Dave Murry, and Dee Dee Murry of Evryware and published in 1989 by Sierra On-Line. It is the sequel to Manhunter: New York, developed by the same authors.

The rights to Manhunter are currently held by Activision following their acquisition of Sierra's intellectual property in 2008.  However, the series is currently considered abandoned, with no plans for resumption.

Plot
The game continues the story depicted in Manhunter: New York. The game begins with the player, piloting an Orb ship in pursuit of the antagonist Phil Cook, crash-landing in San Francisco. Another Manhunter on the ground is killed in the crash, so the player assumes his identity. As the gameplay progresses, the player learns of an organized resistance, experiments that have created mutant slaves, and the goal of the malevolent Orbs. The player is able to turn the mutant slaves back into humans, who go on to kill numerous Orbs in San Francisco. The game reaches its climax when the player is on the verge of catching Phil Cook.  Phil narrowly escapes in an Orb ship with the player hanging on to the outside, flying off towards London.

Reception

Computer and Video Games (UK) gave the game a score of 61%, criticizing the game's unorthodox mixture of adventure and arcade elements (compared to most other Sierra games of the era). Scorpia at Computer Gaming World gave the game a positive review, calling it, "an excellent followup to the previous game".

The game sold more than 100,000 copies.

References

External links

Evryware' s official website

1989 video games
Adventure games
Amiga games
Atari ST games
Classic Mac OS games
DOS games
Evryware games
Post-apocalyptic video games
ScummVM-supported games
Sierra Entertainment games
Single-player video games
Video games developed in the United States
Video games set in 2004
Video games set in San Francisco